The Little Apocalypse (Original Turkish title: Küçük Kıyamet) is a 2006 Turkish psychological horror film directed by the Taylan brothers. (Yağmur and Durul Taylan)

Plot
Bilge had lost her mother in the 1999 earthquake. Several years later, she and her family go on a vacation to the coast. On the way to their rented house, she sees a series of visions. Things get worse when a small earthquake occurs, bringing back memories of her loss and releasing her inner demons.

Cast
Başak Köklükaya (Bilge)
Cansel Elçin (Zeki)
İlker Aksum (Ali)
Binnur Kaya (Filiz)
Bora Akkaş (Batu)
Serra Gürgünlü (Eda)
Ece Ekşi (Didem)
Özgür Çevik (cameo)
Şinasi Yurtsever
Berrin Arısoy

Awards
The film received the following awards:

18th Ankara Film Festival: Best screenplay (Çiçek Kahraman)
12th Sadri Alışık Awards: Best actress (Başak Köklükaya)
38th Siyad Türk Sineması Ödülleri: Best supporting actor (İlker Aksum)

References

External links

Films set in Turkey
2006 films
2000s Turkish-language films
2006 horror films
2000s action horror films
2006 action thriller films
2000s psychological horror films
Turkish horror films
Turkish thriller films
2000s horror thriller films